R. Bangla, officially Republic Bangla, is a free-to-air Indian Bengali-language news channel, launched on 7 March 2021, by Arnab Goswami's Republic Media Network. The channel was announced with the slogan "Kotha Hobey Chokhe Chokh Rekhe" (কথা হবে চোখে চোখ রেখে) (we will now see eye to eye).

The channel is the third launched by Goswami, after the launches of Republic TV in English and Republic Bharat in Hindi.  Goswami himself has spoken of his ambition to launch channels in all states and regional languages across India.

Hosts
The main hosts of this channel are Arnab Goswami, Mayukh Ranjan Ghosh, Swarnali Sarkar, Meenakshi Dev Biswas, Samadrita Mukherjee, Renaissance Chakraborty

References

External links

Bengali-language television channels in India
Television news in India
24-hour television news channels in India
Television channels and stations established in 2021
Television stations in Kolkata
2021 establishments in West Bengal
Republic Media Network